The Almirante Trail toad (Incilius peripatetes) is a species of toad endemic to Panama. It is only known from its type locality near Boquete, Chiriquí, in western Panama. Another population from Cerro Bollo that has been referred to this species was described in 2013 as a separate species, Incilius majordomus.

Etymology
The specific name peripatetes is Greek for "one who walks" and alludes to Charles F. Walker, a student of herpetology at the University of Michigan.

Description
Incilius peripatetes is a medium-sized toad, with the holotype, an adult male, reported to be  in snout–vent length. Dorsal coloration is uniformly light brown or grey. The dorsum is rugose, without enlarged warts. The cranial crests are very prominent, whereas the paratoid glands are slightly small, smaller than the eye. The ventral surface is light brown. The rear surfaces of the thighs and the groin are dark brown or black, with some light spots in the groin. The hands and feet have fleshy webbing between the fingers and toes. There is no vocal sack in the males.

Habitat and conservation
This is a little known terrestrial toad inhabiting premontane wet forest at elevation of  asl. It is likely to be affected by chytridiomycosis. Also some habitat destruction is taking place. It is listed as a critically endangered species due to an expected population decline in coming years.

References

peripetates
Endemic fauna of Panama
Amphibians of Panama
Amphibians described in 1972
Taxa named by Jay M. Savage